Bermuda competed at the 2018 Commonwealth Games in the Gold Coast, Australia from April 4 to April 15, 2018. Bermuda announced it will send a squad of 8 athletes. It was Bermuda's 18th appearance at the Commonwealth Games.

Bermuda won its first gold medal for twenty-eight years and only its second ever gold medal overall when Flora Duffy won the women’s triathlon.

Triathlete Tyler Smith was the country's flag bearer during the opening ceremony.

Medalists

Competitors
The following is the list of number of competitors participating at the Games per sport/discipline.

Tyler Butterfield competed in athletics and triathlon while Flora Duffy competed in cycling and triathlon.

Athletics

Bermuda announced a team of 4 athletes (4 men) will compete at the 2018 Commonwealth Games.

Men
Track & road events

Field events

Cycling

Bermuda announced a team of 1 athlete (1 woman) will compete at the 2018 Commonwealth Games.

Mountain Bike

Squash

Bermuda announced a team of 1 athlete (1 man) will compete at the 2018 Commonwealth Games.

Individual

Triathlon

Bermuda announced a team of 4 athletes (2 men, 2 women) will compete at the 2018 Commonwealth Games.

Individual

Mixed Relay

See also
Bermuda at the 2018 Summer Youth Olympics

References

Nations at the 2018 Commonwealth Games
Bermuda at the Commonwealth Games
2018 in Bermudian sport